In the Microsoft .NET Framework, XML Literal allows a computer program to include XML directly in the code. It is currently only supported in VB.NET 9.0 and VB.NET 10.0. When a Visual Basic expression is embedded in an XML literal, the application creates a LINQ-to-XML object for each literal at run time.

See also
 String literal
 Character literal
 ECMAScript for XML
 JSX (JavaScript)
 XHP

References

External links
 Creating Complex XML Documents with XML Literals
 XML Literals Overview (Visual Basic)

.NET terminology
XML